David Warbeck (born David Mitchell; 17 November 1941 – 23 July 1997) was a New Zealand actor and model best known for his roles in European exploitation and horror films.

A native of Christchurch, New Zealand, Warbeck became involved in local theatre there, which led to him receiving a scholarship to attend the Royal Academy of Dramatic Art in London in 1965. After attending for four terms, Warbeck dropped out and began working as a model. He made his feature film debut in John Hough's Wolfshead: The Legend of Robin Hood (1969), reuniting with the director again for 1971's Twins of Evil. Throughout the 1970s, Warbeck appeared in numerous international exploitation films, including A Fistful of Dynamite (1971) and Black Snake (1974), which established him as a niche action film star.

In 1981, Warbeck starred in two films for Italian horror director Lucio Fulci: The Black Cat and The Beyond. He went on to appear in several independent and exploitation films throughout the 1980s and 1990s before dying of cancer in London in July 1997, aged 55.

Early life
Warbeck was born David Mitchell on 17 November 1941 in Christchurch, New Zealand. He was of Scottish descent. Warbeck attended school in Christchurch and Invercargill. After graduating, Warbeck began training to become an arts teacher. Through this, he became involved with local theatre productions, and performed with a small touring company in New Zealand. While performing in local theatre, Warbeck was awarded a scholarship from the New Zealand Arts Council to attend the Royal Academy of Dramatic Art in London.

Career

Early work
Warbeck arrived in Britain in 1965 to attend the Royal Academy of Dramatic Art, and attended four terms before dropping out and becoming a photographic model. He made his film debut as the title character in Wolfshead: The Legend of Robin Hood (1969), a low-budget film adaptation of the adventures of Robin Hood directed by John Hough. He then appeared in an episode of UFO called "Destruction" in 1970.

Warbeck next landed a small but important role in Sergio Leone's A Fistful of Dynamite (1971). This would be his first foray into Italian cinema, which he would make his home within a few years. He reunited with director Hough appearing in the vampire film Twins of Evil (1971), followed by a minor role in Freddie Francis's exploitation film Craze (1974). Warbeck was then cast in American filmmaker Russ Meyer's cult film Black Snake (1973), in which he portrayed a man in the 1800s searching for his brother on a Caribbean island overseen by a vicious woman who owns a slave plantation. He also had the title role in the British sex comedy The Sex Thief (1973), which was directed by a young Martin Campbell.

Italian films
Warbeck is perhaps best known for his violent horror film roles in the 1980s. One of the most noted of these is Lucio Fulci's The Beyond (1981), in which he portrayed a doctor who helps a woman uncover the mystery behind a Louisiana hotel she has inherited. The same year, he was cast in a supporting part as a police inspector in Fulci's The Black Cat (1981), based on the story by Edgar Allan Poe.

Warbeck's most common work during the 1980s was with director Antonio Margheriti. The exploitation film director produced a series of films which played on the success of mainstream releases such as Raiders of the Lost Ark and The Deer Hunter. Margheriti was best known for his action films, and some of his noted efforts featuring Warbeck were the Vietnam war film The Last Hunter (1980), Hunters of the Golden Cobra (1982) and The Ark of the Sun God (1983). The film was partly filmed and produced in Turkey.

Later work
Thanks to his appearances in several high-profile action and horror films, Warbeck was being seriously considered as the next James Bond, but the role was taken by Roger Moore. Warbeck claimed that for many years he was paid an amount to be a substitute or back-up Bond on the conditions that he not tell anyone and that he be ready for filming at a moment's notice in the case of Moore leaving or threatening to leave the role. One day he read about Timothy Dalton being chosen and was told by the producers that he was now "too old for the role".

Apart from a brief role as an ill-fated agent in the Tom Selleck film Lassiter (1984), Warbeck's later career consisted of several low-budget films including Ratman (1988), Mean Tricks (1992) directed by Umberto Lenzi,  Pervirella (1997), Sudden Fury (1997), and Jake West's British vampire film Razor Blade Smile (1998). He also concentrated on fan conventions in the UK and U.S., where he was popular due to his work with Fulci.

Personal life
Warbeck spent his later life living in Hampstead, London, with his wife Lois, whom he married in 1965. The couple had one daughter. He spent two decades restoring his residence there, which had been built by Sir George Gilbert Scott at the time of the construction of St Pancras Station.

Death
In 1997, three weeks before his death, Warbeck recorded an audio commentary for the LaserDisc release of The Beyond with actress Catriona MacColl. Warbeck died of an unspecified form of cancer in London, England on 23 July 1997.

Filmography

Film

Television

References

Works cited

External links

1941 births
1997 deaths
Alumni of the London Academy of Music and Dramatic Art
Alumni of RADA
Deaths from cancer in England
New Zealand expatriates in the United Kingdom
New Zealand male film actors
New Zealand male models
New Zealand people of Scottish descent
People from Christchurch
20th-century New Zealand male actors